Dobroslav Chrobák (16 February 1907, Hybe  – 16 May 1951, Bratislava) was a Slovak writer.

Life 

He was born in Hybe as the second of four kids to a family of dressmakers. He studied at school in Rožňava and Liptovský Mikuláš, and later at a technical high school in Bratislava. He completed his studies in 1934 at Czech Technical University in Prague. After that, he returned to Bratislava to work as a lecturer. Later, he worked as an editor of radio journalism at Czechoslovak Radio in Bratislava, and the last five years as the regional managing director for Slovakia. He died of a cancerous tumour in Bratislava and is buried in Hybe.

Selected works 
 1924 – Les, story
 1925 – Náraz priam centrický, story
 1931 – Dva kamenné dni, novel
 1937 – Kamarát Jašek, collection of novels and stories 
 1943 – Drak sa vracia (Dragon's Return), fiction

External links 
 

1907 births
1951 deaths
Czechoslovak writers
Slovak writers
Slovak translators
Czech Technical University in Prague alumni

Slovak male writers
Communist Party of Czechoslovakia members